"Gotta Have You" is a song co-written and recorded by American country music artist Eddie Rabbitt.  It was released on November 1, 1986 as the fourth single from the album Rabbitt Trax.  The song reached number 9 on the Billboard Hot Country Singles & Tracks chart.  It was written by Rabbitt, Reed Nielsen and Richard Landis.

Chart performance

References

1987 singles
1986 songs
Eddie Rabbitt songs
Songs written by Eddie Rabbitt
Song recordings produced by Richard Landis
RCA Records singles
Songs written by Richard Landis
Songs written by Reed Nielsen